Tehit is a Papuan language of the Bird's Head Peninsula of New Guinea. Other spellings are Tahit, Tehid, and other names Kaibus, Teminabuan. Dialects are Tehit Jit, Mbol Fle, Saifi, Imyan, Sfa Riere, Fkar, Sawiat Salmeit.

Subdivisions

Subgroups
Major Tehit ethnic subgroups:

Locations of some Tehit subgroups:
Tehit Mlafle and Tehit Mlakya, in Teminabuan District: Kaibus, Werisar, Keyen, Boldon, Seribau, Srer, and Sria villages.
Tehit Konda, in Konda District: Konda, Mnaelek, and Mbariat villages.
Tehit Nakya, in Saifi District: Malaswat, Manggroholo, Sira, Kwowok, Komanggaret, Sayal, Kayabo, Botaen, Sisir, and Knaya villages.
Tehit Imian, in Seremuk District: Gamaro, Tofot, Haha, Woloin, and Kakas villages.
Tehit Nasfa, in Sawiyat District: Wenslolo, Wensnahan, Wensi villages.

Clans
Tehit clans:

Morphology
Tehit has four grammatical genders, which are masculine, feminine, plural, and neuter. Examples:

Gender prefixes in Tehit can not only be used to denote gender, but also size, wholeness, and the stability of appearances. Masculine gender is associated with small size, parts of wholes, and changing appearances, while feminine gender is associated with large size, wholeness, and stable appearances. Examples (from Flassy 1991: 10–12):

References

Further reading

 
 
 
 

Languages of western New Guinea
West Bird's Head languages